Tottempudi is an Indian surname. Notable people with this surname include:

 Tottempudi Gopichand, known as Gopichand (born 1979), Telugu film actor
 Tottempudi Krishna, known as T. Krishna (1927–1987), Telugu editor and director
 Venu Thottempudi (born 1976), an Indian actor in Telugu films

See also
 Thottempudi

Indian surnames